Moustier is a village of Wallonia and district of the municipality of Frasnes-lez-Anvaing, located in the province of Hainaut, Belgium. 

It was a municipality until January 1, 1977.

References 

Former municipalities of Hainaut (province)